Jerry Martin Graham (born Jerry Martin Matthews, December 16, 1928 – January 24, 1997) was an American professional wrestler. He is best known for his time spent in the World Wide Wrestling Federation and as the founder of the Graham wrestling family.

Professional wrestling career 
Graham began wrestling at the age of 14 in his hometown of Phoenix. He was the founder of the storyline Graham wrestling family, which included Eddie Graham (Edward Gossett), "Crazy" Luke Graham (James Grady Johnson), "Superstar" Billy Graham (Wayne Coleman), Mike Graham (Mike Gossett), Jerry Graham Jr., Crazy Luke Graham Jr. and Mad Dog Steele Graham (Tom Hankins). Along with Eddie, Jerry sold out Madison Square Garden many times in the 1950s and late 1960s, when they were known as The Golden Grahams. After his tag team success, Dr. Graham brought "Crazy" Luke Graham and "Superstar" Billy Graham into the Graham family.

Graham feuded with Buddy Rogers in 1956. On November 19, 1957, Graham and Dick the Bruiser wrestled Antonio Rocca and Edouard Carpentier at Madison Square Garden. During the match, a major riot exploded and many fans were arrested, with eight police officers being injured from chairs that were thrown by fans. All of the wrestlers during the match were fined, and Dick the Bruiser was banned for life from wrestling in New York.

When Graham wrestled Bruno Sammartino for the World Wide Wrestling Federation (WWWF)'s World Heavyweight Championship, Madison Square Garden was so packed that more than 10,000 fans were turned away. He held the WWWF United States Tag Team Championship six times, including several reigns with Eddie Graham, one with "brother" Crazy Luke Graham, and one with Johnny Valentine. Graham spent the 1970s training other wrestlers and occasionally wrestling himself.

In 2009, Graham was inducted into the Georgia Wrestling History Hall of Fame. On March 31, 2017, Graham was posthumously inducted into the WWE Hall of Fame as a part of the Legacy wing.

Personal life 
Graham was adopted by his stepfather Harold Graham and his name was legally changed. He falsified his age to enlist in World War II, where he served with the 82nd Airborne Division Paratroopers. After the war, he attended Phoenix College and Arizona State University.

Graham suffered from alcoholism and depression. In August 1969, when his mother died, he grabbed a shotgun from the back of his car and took his mother's corpse out of Good Samaritan Hospital in Phoenix. After the incident, he spent time in the Arizona State Mental Hospital.

In "Superstar" Billy Graham's book Tangled Ropes, he speaks about the real life hatred that Graham had for Freddie Blassie.

Graham died on January 24, 1997, at age of 68 due to complications from a stroke six weeks earlier.

Championships and accomplishments 
 Capitol Wrestling Corporation / World Wide Wrestling Federation / WWE
 NWA United States Tag Team Championship (Northeast version) (5 times) – with Eddie Graham (4), Johnny Valentine (1)
 WWWF United States Tag Team Championship (1 time) – with Luke Graham
 WWE Hall of Fame (Class of 2017)
 Gulf Coast Championship Wrestling
 NWA Gulf Coast Heavyweight Championship (1 time)
 Maple Leaf Wrestling
 NWA International Tag Team Championship (Toronto version) (1 time) – with Bulldog Brower
 Mid-South Sports
 NWA Southern Heavyweight Championship (Georgia version) (2 times)
 NWA World Tag Team Championship (Georgia version) (1 time) – with Don McIntyre
 NWA All-Star Wrestling
 NWA Canadian Tag Team Championship (Vancouver version) (1 time) – with Abdullah the Butcher
 NWA World Tag Team Championship (Vancouver version) (1 time) – with Abdullah the Butcher
 Stampede Wrestling
 NWA International Tag Team Championship (Calgary version) (1 time) – with Jim Wright
 World Wrestling Association
 WWA World Tag Team Championship (2 times) – with Don Kent

References

External links 

 
 

American male professional wrestlers
Professional wrestlers from Oklahoma
Professional wrestling trainers
1928 births
1997 deaths
WWE Hall of Fame Legacy inductees
Phoenix College alumni
Arizona State University alumni
United States Army personnel of World War II
Stampede Wrestling alumni
Burials at Riverside National Cemetery
Child soldiers in World War II
20th-century professional wrestlers
NWA International Tag Team Champions (Toronto version)
Stampede Wrestling International Tag Team Champions